Verderame is a surname. Notable people with the surname include:

Lori Verderame (born 1965), American television personality and art appraiser
Luigi Verderame (born 1950), Belgian singer

See also
Verdirame